Dolné Saliby is a village and municipality in Galanta District of the Trnava Region of south-west Slovakia.

Geography
The municipality lies at an elevation of 116 metres and covers an area of 18.717 km². It has a population of about 1,957 people.

History
In the 9th century, the territory of Dolné Saliby became part of the Kingdom of Hungary. In historical records the village was first mentioned in 1158.
After the Austro-Hungarian army disintegrated in November 1918, Czechoslovak troops occupied the area, later acknowledged internationally by the Treaty of Trianon. Between 1938 and 1945 Dolné Saliby once more became part of Miklós Horthy's Hungary through the First Vienna Award. From 1945 until the Velvet Divorce, it was part of Czechoslovakia. Since then it has been part of Slovakia.

Genealogical resources

The records for genealogical research are available at the state archive "Statny Archiv in Bratislava, Banska Bystrica, Bytca, Kosice, Levoca, Nitra, Presov, Slovakia"

 Roman Catholic church records (births/marriages/deaths): 1678-1931 (parish B)
 Lutheran church records (births/marriages/deaths): 1784-1896 (parish A)
 Reformated church records (births/marriages/deaths): 1792-1896 (parish B)

See also
 List of municipalities and towns in Slovakia

References

External links
https://web.archive.org/web/20071116010355/http://www.statistics.sk/mosmis/eng/run.html
Surnames of living people in Dolne Saliby

Villages and municipalities in Galanta District
Hungarian communities in Slovakia